Taksar is a former VDC and now a neighborhood of Bhojpur Municipality in Bhojpur District in Province No. 1 of eastern Nepal. At the time of the 1991 Nepal census, Taksar had a population of 4,524 persons living in 829 individual households.

On 18 May 2014, the Government of Nepal announced the establishment of seventy-two new municipalities across the country. At this time, Bhojpur Municipality was established, incorporating Bhojpur, Bhaisipankha, Bokhim and Taksar VDCs, subdivided into eleven wards.

It is now Ward No. 12 of Bhojpur Municipality.

References

External links
UN map of the municipalities of Bhojpur District

Populated places in Bhojpur District, Nepal
Bhojpur Municipality